Stiefelmeyer's is a historic commercial building in Cullman, Alabama.  The store was founded in 1888, and occupied a two-story frame storehouse until it was destroyed by fire in 1892.  Although brick had already become the material of choice for commercial buildings in the town, the current Stiefelmeyer's was built in 1892 of wood.  An addition was constructed in 1900, expanding the building to its current size.  As other wood commercial buildings were destroyed by fire and replaced with brick structures, Stiefelmeyer's remains the only example of the once-dominant building material in Cullman's commercial district.

The two-story building was designed in Italianate style.  The building has a tall cornice with scroll-cut brackets and modillions.  The front façade features two sets of double-leaf doors, each flanked by large display windows resting on marble base panels.  A shed roofed canopy, similar to the one installed around 1900, covers the sidewalk along the front.  The first floor doors and windows are topped with prism glass transoms.  Two further entrances are along the 2nd Street side, one in the middle, and a recessed entrance near the rear.  Several one-over-one sash windows with small transoms also line the side of the building.  The second floor on the front and side also have rows of one-over-one windows.

The building was listed on the Alabama Register of Landmarks and Heritage in 1978 and the National Register of Historic Places in 1983.

References

National Register of Historic Places in Cullman County, Alabama
Commercial buildings on the National Register of Historic Places in Alabama
Italianate architecture in Alabama
Commercial buildings completed in 1892
Buildings and structures in Cullman County, Alabama
Properties on the Alabama Register of Landmarks and Heritage